Nyaung Pin Thar is a village located in Ayeyarwady Region, Ingapu Township in Myanmar.

References

Ayeyarwady Region
Villages in Myanmar